C. J. Ponraj is an Indian Administrative Service Officer from Nagercoil, Tamil Nadu, India. He serves at Nagaland, India. He is the Principal Law Secretary and former Chief Electoral Officer at Kohima, Nagaland.

References

Indian Administrative Service officers
People from Tamil Nadu
Living people
Chennai
Year of birth missing (living people)